China Tibet Online (CTO) is a multilingual propaganda website dedicated to Tibet-related topics. A key national-level website, it provides updated news and stories on the Tibet Autonomous Region and other Tibetan inhabited areas. The Tibetan-language version (tb.tibet.cn) was launched in 2001. It was renewed with more contents of news, religion, culture, health and folk customs in December 2010.

The site is available in Chinese (Simplified), Chinese (Traditional), Tibetan, English, German and French.

References

External links
Tibet.cn website

Chinese political websites
Tibetan news websites